Emerald Cave is a cave located on the west coast of Ko Muk (also known as Ko Mook) Island, - The paradise island of Ko Muk and Emerald Cave are part of the Trang Provence, Southern Thailand.

The cave has a narrow 20m long tunnel. The cave can be entered either by swimming or by using a kayak. It is best to see the cave at mid tide, because at low tide there will be no water, hence no 'emerald' on the beach inside.

Outside the cave, there is a lagoon which is surrounded by tropical plants and a beach. The name of the cave is derived from the phenomenon that occurs, when the sun shines on the water, which reflects colored light all over the cave’s wall. This can only be seen between 10.00 am and 2.00 pm.

See also 
 List of caves
 Speleology

References

Geography of Trang province
Tourist attractions in Trang province
Caves of Thailand